The 2015–16 Umaglesi Liga was the 27th season of top-tier football in Georgia. Dila Gori were the defending champions. The season began on 13 August 2015 and ended on 22 May 2016. It was a last season with an autumn-spring schedule before the changes of competition format to spring-autumn schedule from 2017 season.

Teams

Stadiums and locations

League table

Results

Relegation play-offs

A match was played between Zugdidi, the fourteenth-placed team from the 2015–16 Umaglesi Liga and Kolkheti Khobi, the third-placed team from the 2015–16 Pirveli Liga. The winners, Zugdidi, remained in the top-flight for next season.

Top goalscorers

Source: Top15goalscorers.blogspot.com

See also
 2015–16 Pirveli Liga
 2015–16 Georgian Cup

References

External links
  

Erovnuli Liga seasons
1
Georgia